The Union for Ivory Coast (abbreviated UPCI) is political party in the Ivory Coast led by former Me Brahima Soro. It was part of the Rally of Houphouëtists for Democracy and Peace alliance in the 2011 elections, but ran independently in the parliamentary elections in 2016, where it won three seats.

References

Political parties in Ivory Coast